Telmo Emanuel Gomes Arcanjo (born 21 June 2001) is a footballer who plays as a midfielder for Tondela. Born in Portugal, he represents the Cape Verde national team.

Professional career
Arcanjo made his professional debut with Tondela in a 3-2 Primeira Liga loss to Gil Vicente F.C. on 14 July 2020.

International career
Born in Portugal, Arcanjo is of Cape Verdean descent. He represented the Cape Verde U19s in a friendly 2-0 loss to the Portugal U19s on 30 January 2019. He was called up to the Cape Verde national team for a pair of friendlies in June 2021. He debuted with the Cape Verde national team in a friendly 2–0 loss to Senegal on 8 June 2021.

Personal life
Arcanjo is the brother of the Cape Verde international footballer Fábio Arcanjo.

References

External links
 
 Zero Zero Profile
 BDFutbol Profile

2001 births
Living people
Citizens of Cape Verde through descent
Cape Verdean footballers
Association football midfielders
Cape Verde under-21 international footballers
Cape Verde international footballers
Footballers from Lisbon
Portuguese footballers
C.D. Tondela players
Primeira Liga players
Portuguese sportspeople of Cape Verdean descent